Francis Donald Logan  (born March 9, 1930, died February 22, 2022) was an American historian who was Professor of History at Emmanuel College.

Biography
Francis Donald Logan was born in Boston on March 9, 1930, the son of Joseph (a milk deliverer) and Laura (MacDonald). Educated at St. John's Seminary, the University of Toronto and the Pontifical Institute of Mediaeval Studies, Logan has served as Professor Emeritus of History of Emmanuel College since 1993. He is the author of several notable works on the Vikings and religious history. Logan is a Fulbright Scholar, a Guggenheim Fellow, and a fellow of the Pontifical Institute of Mediaeval Studies, the Royal Historical Society and the Society of Antiquaries of London.

He died at his house on February 22, 2022

Selected bibliography
 Excommunication and the Secular Arm in Medieval England: A Study in Legal Procedure from the Thirteenth to the Sixteenth Century, 1968
 The Vikings in History, 1983
 A History of the Church in the Middle Ages, 2002
 The Medieval Court of Arches, 2005
 Runaway Religious in Medieval England,  1240–1540, 1996

References

1930 births
2022 deaths
American medievalists
American historians
Historians of Christianity
Fellows of the Royal Historical Society
Fellows of the Society of Antiquaries of London
People from Boston
University of Toronto alumni
Fulbright alumni